Freddy Cedeño (born 10 September 1981) is a Venezuelan volleyball player. He competed in the men's tournament at the 2008 Summer Olympics.

References

1981 births
Living people
Venezuelan men's volleyball players
Olympic volleyball players of Venezuela
Volleyball players at the 2008 Summer Olympics
Sportspeople from Caracas